The 1935 West Tennessee State Teachers football team was an American football team that represented the West Tennessee State Teachers College (now known as the University of Memphis) as a member of the Southern Intercollegiate Athletic Association during the 1935 college football season. In their twelfth season under head coach Zach Curlin, West Tennessee State Teachers compiled a 1–6–1 record.

Schedule

References

West Tennessee State Teachers
Memphis Tigers football seasons
West Tennessee State Teachers football